Suhair Vadakkepeedika (born 27 July 1992), commonly known as VP Suhair, is an Indian professional footballer who plays as a forward for Indian Super League club East Bengal and the India national team.

Early life 
Suhair was born on 27 July 1992 in Edathanattukara, Palakkad, Kerala. He is a product of United SC. He started his career playing for Calicut University and local clubs in Kerala. He also represented the Kerala football team in the National Games and the Santosh Trophy. Later he joined Kolkata outfit United SC and played in the Calcutta Football League.

Club career

I-League clubs 
East Bengal signed him in December 2016. He scored a hat-trick in his first match against Rainbow AC. He suffered an ankle injury on the eve of East Bengal's season opener against Shillong. He ended the season without playing a single match and finally the club released him.  Later, he joined Gokulam Kerala in March 2018.

On 3 June 2019, Suhair joined Mohun Bagan.

NorthEast United 
On 30 September 2020, Suhair penned down a two–year deal with NorthEast United. Suhair scored 3 goals in 19 appearances for the Highlanders in 2020–21 Indian Super League season.

On 20 November 2021, Suhair scored his first goal in 2021–22 Season in a 1–2 lost against Chennaiyin. He scored his second goal of the season against SC East Bengal. On 21 December 2021, he opened the scoring just 1 min 42 seconds into the match, the fastest goal in NorthEast United history. In the end of the 2021–22 season Suhair scored four goals and provides two assists for the Highlanders.

International career
In March 2022, Suhair was called up for the national squad by coach Igor Štimac ahead of India's two friendly matches against Bahrain and Belarus.

Career statistics

Club

References

External links

Living people
1992 births
Indian footballers
India international footballers
Footballers from Kerala
Association football forwards
Gokulam Kerala FC players
Mohun Bagan AC players
I-League players
United SC players
East Bengal Club players
Indian Super League players
NorthEast United FC players